Ulipukuri is a village of the Benghari Bonogram Union of Boda Upazila in the Panchagarh District of northern Bangladesh. This area is located in the Northern Region of Bangladesh, near its border with India. The name "Ulipukuri" is Bengali for "Oli and the Pond", deriving from local Islamic studies called Oli and a pond.

The village occupies 4 square kilometres.

Amenities 
A mosque and primary school were established nearly 100 years ago.

The centre village features a nearly 200-year-old mango tree. In winter, the snow-covered Himalayas can be seen from the village. The majority of residents are Muslims.

Demographics 
The literacy rate in the village is low.

Economy 
Rice and nuts are the main crops, while wheat, tea, and sugarcane are also produced.

Culture 
The Youth club of this village organises a cultural programme on every Ramadan Eid day. All residents of village attend the function.

Transport
A bitumen road is under construction.

Education
A government primary school operates there.

Sub-areas
Danga Para
Choto Fakir Para
Boro Fakir Para
Poshchim Para
Ulipukuri
Sontura

References

Sources 
 http://www.panchagarh.info/Boda_SchoolAndColleges.htm

http://www.bodaup.panchagarh.gov.bd/site/top_banner/0a2457d6-18ff-11e7-9461-286ed488c766/%E0%A6%89%E0%A6%B2%E0%A6%BF%E0%A6%AA%E0%A7%81%E0%A6%95%E0%A7%81%E0%A6%B0%E0%A7%80-%E0%A6%AC%E0%A6%BE%E0%A7%9F%E0%A6%A4%E0%A7%81%E0%A6%B2-%E0%A6%A8%E0%A7%82%E0%A6%B0-%E0%A6%9C%E0%A6%BE%E0%A6%AE%E0%A7%87-%E0%A6%AE%E0%A6%B8%E0%A6%9C%E0%A6%BF%E0%A6%A6

Panchagarh District